Filipa de Almada was a Portuguese poet and noblewoman.

Almada is known to have lived and written during the reigns of kings Alfonso V and John II of Portugal. Her poetry was included in the 1516 songbook Cancioneiro Geral anthologized by Garcia de Resende.

References

Portuguese women poets
15th-century Portuguese women writers
15th-century Portuguese writers